2nd Independent Division of Fujian Provincial Military District was formed in April 1966 from the Public Security Contingent of Fujian province. The division was composed of three regiments (4th to 6th). The division stationed in Putian, Fujian.

From November 1969 the division was transferred to 29th Army Corps.

In April 1975 the division moved to Nanping for security mission.

In February 1976 the division was renamed as Independent Division of Fujian Provincial Military District. Its 4th, 5th and 6th regiments were renamed as 1st, 2nd and 3rd Infantry Regiments. Artillery Regiment was formed in the same month.

In December 1980 the division was disbanded.

References
中国各省军区独立师的历史沿革, https://web.archive.org/web/20160918225002/http://www.360doc.com/content/13/1205/20/1164894_334784330.shtml

IF2
Military units and formations established in 1966
Military units and formations disestablished in 1980